Jozef Chovanec (born 7 March 1960) is a Czech former professional football player and manager.

Playing career
As a player, Chovanec spent almost his whole career at Sparta Prague. In 1988, he moved to the Netherlands, to play briefly for PSV Eindhoven. He played for Czechoslovakia and was a participant in the 1990 FIFA World Cup.

Coaching career
Chovanec coached the Czech Republic from 1998 to 2001. He managed to qualify his team to Euro 2000 but then failed to do so for the World Cup 2002, being eliminated by Belgium in the play-off matches two times by 1–0.

On 8 October 2008, Chovanec returned to Sparta Prague for his fourth spell as manager and parted from the club in December 2011.

On 19 June 2012, Chovanec was appointed head coach of UAE Pro-League side Baniyas SC.

Corruption scandal
In October 2020 Chovanec has been removed from the position as chairman of the referees of the Football Association of the Czech Republic due to Roman Berbr corruption affair.

References

External links
 
 Profile at idnes.cz 
 Trenéři v celé historii Sparty at sparta.cz 
 
 

1960 births
Living people
People from Púchov District
Sportspeople from the Trenčín Region
Czech people of Slovak descent
Czech footballers
Czechoslovak footballers
Association football midfielders
Czechoslovakia international footballers
MŠK Púchov players
Czech First League players
AC Sparta Prague players
FK Hvězda Cheb players
PSV Eindhoven players
1990 FIFA World Cup players
Czech football managers
UEFA Euro 2000 managers
Czech Republic national football team managers
Czech First League managers
AC Sparta Prague managers
1. FK Příbram managers
Baniyas SC managers
FC Kuban Krasnodar managers
MFK Ružomberok managers
ŠK Slovan Bratislava managers
Czech football chairmen and investors
Czechoslovak expatriate footballers
Czech expatriate football managers
Czechoslovak expatriate sportspeople in the Netherlands
Expatriate footballers in the Netherlands
Czech expatriate sportspeople in Russia
Expatriate football managers in Russia
Czech expatriate sportspeople in the United Arab Emirates
Expatriate football managers in the United Arab Emirates